Popular music and motion pictures have been linked since the dawn of the talkies and The Jazz Singer (1927). While numerous films in the intervening years have featured popular music in their sound tracks, and many have profiled solo artists, the list of films about popular bands is much shorter. The following are significant theatrical films that tell the stories of real or imagined musical groups.

List of motion pictures about music bands (real or fictional)

References 

Bands
Films about music and musicians